The 2022 Idaho Vandals football team represented the University of Idaho as in the Big Sky Conference during the 2022 NCAA Division I FCS football season. Led by first-year head coach Jason Eck, the Vandals were 7–4 in the regular season (6–2 in Big Sky, third) and played their home games on campus at the Kibbie Dome in Moscow, Idaho.

Idaho defeated rival Montana for the first time since 1999 and made their twelfth appearance in the FCS playoffs, the first since 1995 (the program was in FBS from 1996 through 2017).

Hired in December 2021, Eck was previously the offensive coordinator at South Dakota State; earlier, he was an assistant coach at Idaho for three seasons (2004–06).

Previous season 

The Vandals finished the 2021 season at 4–7 (3–5 in Big Sky, ninth). It was the ninth and final season for head coach Paul Petrino.

Preseason

Polls
During the virtual Big Sky Kickoff on July 25, the Vandals were predicted to finish eighth by the coaches, and ninth by the media.

Preseason All–Big Sky team
The Vandals had one player selected to the preseason all-Big Sky team.

Defense

Fa'Avae Fa'Avae – OLB

Roster

Schedule

Game summaries

at Washington State

at Indiana

Drake

at Northern Arizona

Northern Colorado

No. 3 Montana

Portland State

at No. 2 Sacramento State

Eastern Washington

UC Davis

at Idaho State

FCS Playoffs

at No. 17 Southeastern Louisiana – First Round

References

Idaho
Idaho Vandals football seasons
Idaho
Idaho Vandals football